Oratorio del Gonfalone or Oratory of the Banner can refer to the following buildings:

Oratorio del Gonfalone, Fabriano
Oratorio del Gonfalone, Rome
Oratorio del Gonfalone, Vicenza